Bailey is an unincorporated community in Big Lake Township, Sherburne County, Minnesota, United States.  The community is located between Big Lake and Elk River near the junction of Sherburne County Roads 14 and 15, and U.S. Highway 10.

The community was named for Orlando Bailey, an early settler.

References

Unincorporated communities in Minnesota
Unincorporated communities in Sherburne County, Minnesota